The Upytė is a river of Kėdainiai district municipality, Kaunas County, central Lithuania. It is a right tributary of the river Nevėžis.

It begins nearby Galulaukiai village. It flows mostly southwards and meets the Nevėžis between Karūnava and Vainikai villages. A little pond is dammed on the Upytė in Karūnava.

The name Upytė in Lithuanian means 'little river, rivulet'.

References
 LIETUVOS RESPUBLIKOS UPIŲ IR TVENKINIŲ KLASIFIKATORIUS (Republic of Lithuania- River and Pond Classifications).  Ministry of Environment (Lithuania). Accessed 2011-11-17.

Rivers of Lithuania
Kėdainiai District Municipality